The Order for Meritorious Service is a South African National Order that consisted of two classes, in gold and silver, and was awarded to deserving South African citizens. The order was discontinued on 2 December 2002.

Institution
The Order for Meritorious Service was instituted by the Republic of South Africa in 1986, by Warrant published in Government Gazette no. 10493 dated 24 October 1986. It superseded the earlier Decoration for Meritorious Services. The order could be awarded in two classes:
 The Order for Meritorious Service, Class I, Gold, post-nominal letters OMSG, for exceptional merit.
 The Order for Meritorious Service, Class II, Silver, post-nominal letters OMSS, for outstanding merit.

Award criteria
The Order was awarded by the State President and, from 1994, the President, to South Africans who had rendered exceptional public service. Recipients included cabinet ministers, judges, captains of commerce and industry, church leaders, academics, sports stars and prominent figures in the arts and sciences.

Order of wear
The positions of the two classes of the Order for Meritorious Service in the official order of precedence were revised three times after 1986 to accommodate the inclusion or institution of new decorations and medals, first with the integration process of 1994, again when decorations and medals were belatedly instituted in April 1996 for the two former non-statutory para-military forces, the Azanian People's Liberation Army and Umkhonto we Sizwe, and again with the institution of new sets of awards in 2002 and 2003.

Order for Meritorious Service, Gold
Official national order of precedence until 26 April 1994
 Preceded by the Star of South Africa, Gold and Star of South Africa, Grand Cross.
 Succeeded by the Order of Good Hope, Class I, Grand Collar/Grand Cross.

Official national order of precedence from 27 April 1994
 Preceded by the Order of Thohoyandou, Special Class, Grand Cross of the Republic of Venda.
 Succeeded by the Order of Transkei, Class I, Grand Cross (GCT) of the Republic of Transkei.

The position of the Order for Meritorious Service, Gold in the South African order of precedence remained unchanged, as it was on 27 April 1994, when new awards were instituted in 1996, 2002 and 2003.

Order for Meritorious Service, Silver
Official national order of precedence until 26 April 1994
 Preceded by the Star of South Africa, Silver and Star of South Africa, Grand Officer.
 Succeeded by the Order of Good Hope, Class II, Grand Officer, Silver.

Official national order of precedence from 27 April 1994
 Preceded by the Order of Indwe, Class I of the Republic of Ciskei.
 Succeeded by the Order of Transkei, Class II, Grand Officer (GOT) of the Republic of Transkei.

The position of the Order for Meritorious Service, Silver in the South African order of precedence remained unchanged, as it was on 27 April 1994, when new awards were instituted in 1996, 2002 and 2003.

Description
Both classes share the same ribbon and are worn around the neck.

Obverse
The badge of the Order is a white-enamelled gold or silver gable cross that displays the national arms on a shield in the centre of a smaller gold or silver cross paty.

Reverse
The reverse has the pre-1994 South African Coat of Arms.

Suspender
The suspender is in the form of the crest of the pre-1994 South African Coat of Arms, a lion holding four staves to represent the four provinces of the Union of South Africa, above an outline of an inverted gable.

Breast star
The breast star consists of the badge of the order superimposed on a four-pointed multi-rayed diagonal star.

Ribbon
The original ribbon was 35 millimetres wide and in the colours of the 1928 South African flag, with a 6 millimetres wide dark blue band, a 4 millimetres wide white band and a 5½ millimetres wide orange band, repeated in reverse order and separated by a 4 millimetres wide white band.

A new ribbon was introduced in 1996, in the colours of the new post-1994 South African flag.

Discontinuation
Conferment of the decoration was discontinued in 2003 when a new set of national orders was instituted.

Recipients
The known recipients are listed in the table.

Note:  denotes a posthumous award.

References

Orders of South Africa
Awards established in 1986
1986 establishments in South Africa
Awards disestablished in 2002
2002 disestablishments in South Africa